The 1989 North Star Conference Women's Basketball Tournament was held in Chicago, Illinois. The tournament began on March 9, 1989, and ended on March 11, 1989.

North Star Conference standings

1989 North Star Conference Tournament 
 First Round March 9, 1989 Northern Illinois 96, Cleveland State 64
 First Round March 9, 1989 Green Bay 67, Illinois Chicago 53
 First Round March 9, 1989 Akron 73, Marquette 60
 First Round March 9, 1989 DePaul 90, Valparaiso 54
 Semifinals March 10, 1989 Northern Illinois 71, Akron 64
 Semifinals March 10, 1989 DePaul 73, Green Bay 64
 Championship March 11, 1989 DePaul 76, Northern Illinois 61

References 

North Star
North Star Conference